Sterling Flunder (born February 14, 1986 in Bothell, Washington) is a retired American soccer player who last played for Pittsburgh Riverhounds in the USL.

Career

College and Amateur
Flunder played club soccer for Snohomish United and the Sandpoint Strikers, was a three-time Washington State ODP team player, and played one year of college soccer at Spokane Community College, before moving to Marshall University prior to his sophomore season. With the Herd he was named to the C-USA second team and the C-USA All-Tournament team as a sophomore, and earned All-Conference Third team honors as a junior.

During his college years Flunder also played with West Virginia Chaos and Portland Timbers U23s in the USL Premier Development League.

Professional
Flunder turned professional in 2010 when he signed for the Pittsburgh Riverhounds of the USL Second Division. He made his professional debut on May 15, 2010 in a game against Charleston Battery. Flunder played for the team until February 2016 when he officially announced his retirement from playing so that he could lead one of the club's academies full-time. Over the course of six seasons, he made 123 league appearances for the club, ranking among the highest players all-time in that category.

References

External links
Marshall bio

1986 births
Living people
American soccer players
Marshall Thundering Herd men's soccer players
West Virginia Chaos players
Portland Timbers U23s players
Pittsburgh Riverhounds SC players
Soccer players from Washington (state)
USL League Two players
USL Second Division players
USL Championship players
Association football midfielders
Association football defenders